Peter J. Donnelly was an outfielder in professional baseball. He played for the Fort Wayne Kekiongas in the National Association in 1871.

External links

Major League Baseball outfielders
Fort Wayne Kekiongas players